The Point Diablo Light is a lighthouse in California, United States, about halfway between Point Bonita and Lime Point on the northern side of the Golden Gate Bridge, California

History
In 1923, the Lighthouse Service decided to mark this navigational hazard, and a small white shack with a pitched red roof was placed on the sloping point some eighty feet above the water. An array of solar panels now powers the modern beacon positioned atop the shack.

See also

 List of lighthouses in the United States

References

Lighthouses completed in 1923
Lighthouses in the San Francisco Bay Area
Transportation buildings and structures in Marin County, California
1923 establishments in California